Tobias Wadenka (born 15 October 1990) is a German male badminton player.

Achievements

BWF International Challenge/Series

Men's Doubles

 BWF International Challenge tournament
 BWF International Series tournament
 BWF Future Series tournament

References

External links 

1990 births
Living people
Sportspeople from Nuremberg
German male badminton players